Eisbachtaler Sportfreunde is a German association football club based in Nentershausen, Rhineland-Palatinate.



History
Eisbachtaler Sportfreunde were formed in 1966 as a merger of local teams SC Großholbach, TuS Girod-Kleinholbach, VfR Nomborn, TuS Heilberscheid and TuS Nentershausen. The oldest of these clubs was founded in 1919, which is recognized as the official founding year. Eisbachtal immediately began their rise through the league system and eventually reached the Regionalliga Südwest in 1972, then the second-highest tier in German football. Due to the introduction of the 2. Bundesliga in 1974, the club was relegated to the Amateurklasse. In 1978, Sportfreunde were founding members of the newly introduced Oberliga Südwest, and stayed in this league until their relegation in 1986. The next years were spent in the Verbandsliga Rheinland, before they eventually returned to the Oberliga in 1990. Eisbachtal established themselves as one of the better teams for the next decade, missing out on promotion to the Regionalliga West/Südwest several times. At the beginning of the new millennium, the strength of the club gradually decreased and eventually culminated in relegation to the fifth-tier Verbandsliga Rheinland in 2003.

After four years in the Verbandsliga Rheinland, which had been renamed Rheinlandliga in the meantime, Eisbachtal surprisingly dropped yet another level to the Bezirksliga in 2007. They made their immediate return to the Rheinlandliga in 2008 after winning a four team relegation round before achieving promotion to the Oberliga Südwest at the end of the 2008–09 season.

After two Oberliga seasons the club dropped to the Rheinlandliga once more, where it played for an additional eight until 2019, when Eisbachtal won the league and earned another promotion to the renamed Oberliga Rhineland-Pfalz/Saar where the club plays today.

Honours
The club's honours:
 Oberliga Südwest / Rhineland-Pfalz/Saar
 Runners-up: 1995, 1998, 2022
 Rheinlandliga
 Champions: 1972, 1990, 2009, 2019

Stadium
Sportfreunde Eisbachtal currently play in the Eisbachtalstadion, which has a capacity of 6,000.

The stadium is in use since 1972. Before that, the club played in the Waldstadion Großholbach, the ground of co-founders SC Großholbach.

Recent seasons
The recent season-by-season performance of the club:

With the introduction of the Regionalligas in 1994 and the 3. Liga in 2008 as the new third tier, below the 2. Bundesliga, all leagues below dropped one tier. In 2012 the Oberliga Südwest was renamed Oberliga Rheinland-Pfalz/Saar.

References

External links
 Official team site 
 Abseits Guide to German Soccer
 Das deutsche Fußball-Archiv historical German domestic league tables 

Football clubs in Germany
Football clubs in Rhineland-Palatinate
Association football clubs established in 1966
1966 establishments in West Germany